Laughton en le Morthen  is a village and civil parish in the Metropolitan Borough of Rotherham lying to the south of Rotherham, South Yorkshire, England, and its main attraction is the All Saints Church with its tower and spire of 185 feet. The village had a population of 1,241 at the 2011 Census. The parish also includes the hamlets of Carr, Slade Hooton and Brookhouse.

History
In the mid 11th century, Edwin, Earl of Mercia is believed to have built a Saxon hall in the village. But following the Norman conquest of England after 1066, the village and its lands were given by William the Conqueror to Roger de Busli (c. 1038 – c. 1099), a Norman baron who had been a loyal supporter of William's claim to the English throne. Busli was also given feudal manors in Nottinghamshire, Derbyshire and the Strafforth wapentake of Yorkshire.

To enforce his rule, Laughton castle was among a number that Busli had built in the late 11th century. An outer bailey, which is now the churchyard of the 14th century All Saints parish church, also had substantial earth ramparts and a dry ditch. It's believed that Busli built his castle on the site of the Saxon hall by Mercian Earl, Edwin.

By the time of the Domesday survey in 1085, Busli's extensive feudal landholdings, which Laughton-en-le-Morthen was part of, was known as the "Honour of Blythe" because it included 86 manors in Nottinghamshire, 46 in Yorkshire, and others in Derbyshire, Lincolnshire and Leicestershire, as well as one in Devon. He also controlled castles at Tickhill, Kimberworth, and Mexborough.

Modern 
Laughton has two schools, the council-run Laughton Junior and Infant School, and the Laughton Church of England School, which is situated directly opposite All Saints Church, whose distinctive spire is visible from Lincolnshire on a clear day, and is a local landmark dominating the area from the hill.

There were also two public houses in the village, the St Leger Arms (named after local landowners the St. Leger family) which like many other village pubs closed in 2009, and is now a residential property, and the Hatfeild Arms, also named after a well known local family, which closed in 2018 and remains an empty building.

The village sits on the main bus route from Worksop to Rotherham (19 operated by Stagecoach) and the Dinnington to Doncaster service (18 operated by Powells buses).

In the Second World War, a German bomber on his way back from a raid on Sheffield dropped an unused bomb on the village, which failed to go off; local farmer Henry Turner, whose family recently still lived in the village, towed the bomb to safety across his fields.

Sport
The village was represented in the FA Cup by Laughton Common F.C. during the 1920s.

See also
Listed buildings in Laughton en le Morthen

References

External links
 

Villages in South Yorkshire
Civil parishes in South Yorkshire
Geography of the Metropolitan Borough of Rotherham